Kiril (birth name Nikola Popovski, Macedonian Cyrillic: Никола Поповски), was Metropolitan bishop of the no longer existing Diocese of Polog and Kumanovo of Macedonian Orthodox Church – Ohrid Archbishopric.

Education

Kiril completed primary education in his native village and Theological Seminary in Prizren, in present Kosovo. In 1965 he enrolled in the Moscow Spiritual Academy, but after two years of study he came back to Macedonia and completed his studies at the Theological faculty "St. Clement of Ohrid" in Skopje.

See also
 Diocese of Polog and Kumanovo
 Joseph of Kumanovo and Osogovo
 Diocese of Kumanovo and Osogovo
 List of Metropolitans of Diocese of Kumanovo and Osogovo
 Macedonian Orthodox Church – Ohrid Archbishopric
 Kumanovo

References

External links
 Biography of Kiril on Macedonian
 Diocese of Polog and Kumanovo on MOC-OA Site
 Official Page of Diocese of Polog and Kumanovo

Members of the Macedonian Orthodox Church
People from Resen Municipality
2013 deaths
1934 births
People from Kumanovo